Robert Booth is a British former professional tennis player.

Booth, a tall 196 cm player from Hampshire with a best singles world ranking of 549, made several attempts to qualify for the Wimbledon main draw during his career. In 1981 he qualified for the men's doubles main draw with Jörgen Windahl and they lost their first round match in five sets to the American pairing of Scott McCain and Steve Meister.

References

External links
 
 

Year of birth missing (living people)
Living people
British male tennis players
English male tennis players
Tennis people from Hampshire